Bescond is a French surname. Notable people with the surname include:

 Anaïs Bescond (born 1987), French biathlete
 Jean-Baptiste Le Bescond (born 1980), French football player
 Yves-Marie-Henri Bescond (1924–2018), French Prelate of Roman Catholic Church

French-language surnames